The Nagari Pracharini Sabha (Society for Promotion of Nagari), also known as Kashi Nagari Pracharini Sabha, was an organization founded in 1893 at the Queen's College, Varanasi for the promotion of the Devanagari script over the more common Kaithi script.

In 1899, it helped Chintamani Ghosh, proprietor of Indian Press, establish Saraswati, first Hindi monthly magazine, which came out in January 1900. In 1929, Kala Parishad was transferred to Kashi Nagari Pracharini Sabha and given as new name Bharat Kala Bhavan (Indian Art Museum), which was formally opened on 3 March 1930.

Dictionaries are among the many scholarly publications by the Sabha. The Hiṅdi-śabdasāgara by Śyāmasundara Dāsa was first published 1916–1928, with a new edition published 1965–1975.

References

Bibliography

External links
 Official website
 Official website archived version
 Dasa, Syamasundara. Hindi sabdasagara. Navina samskarana. Kasi: Nagari Pracarini Sabha, 1965-1975.

Hindi
Language education in India
Language advocacy organizations
Organisations based in Varanasi
Publishing companies established in 1893
History of Varanasi
Banaras Hindu University
1893 establishments in India